Dairoides is a genus of crustaceans belonging to the monotypic family Dairoididae.

The species of this genus are found in Southern Africa and Pacific Ocean.

Species:

Dairoides kusei 
Dairoides margaritatus 
Dairoides seafdeci

References

Decapods